2001–02 Országos Bajnokság I (men's water polo) was the 96th water polo championship in Hungary.

First stage 

Pld - Played; W - Won; L - Lost; PF - Points for; PA - Points against; Diff - Difference; Pts - Points.

Second stage

Championship Round 

Pld - Played; W - Won; L - Lost; PF - Points for; PA - Points against; Diff - Difference; Pts - Points.

Relegation Round 

Pld - Played; W - Won; L - Lost; PF - Points for; PA - Points against; Diff - Difference; Pts - Points.

Championship Playoff

Final standing

Sources 
Magyar sportévkönyv 2003

Seasons in Hungarian water polo competitions
Hungary
2001 in water polo
2001 in Hungarian sport
2002 in water polo
2002 in Hungarian sport